Poetry for the Poisoned is the ninth studio album from metal band Kamelot. It was released on the earMUSIC label, a subdivision of Edel, on September 10, 2010 in Europe, and four days later in North America by the band's own label, KMG Recordings, in conjunction with Knife Fight Media.

It is the last Kamelot album with longtime lead vocalist and songwriter Roy Khan who left the band in 2011, and the first with original bass guitarist Sean Tibbetts, who left the band in 1992 prior to any release and returned in 2009 after 17 years.

A video was recorded for the song "The Great Pandemonium" and released on the band's official YouTube channel on September 6.

Track listing

Bonus tracks

Special edition DVD 
"The Great Pandemonium" (video)
Pick and Play for the song "The Great Pandemonium"
Live at Norway Rock Festival 2010
Interviews with each Kamelot member
Background Images
"House on a Hill" (uncut version) (US version only)

Limited tour edition
In 2011, a reissue of Poetry for the Poisoned entitled Poetry for the Poisoned & Live From Wacken: Limited Tour Edition was released on April 15 in Europe and May 10 in the US. The album was released as a double-disc set, with the first disc featuring Poetry for the Poisoned as previously released and the second disc contained 8 live tracks from their show at Wacken Open Air 2010.

Track listing
Disc 1:

Disc 2 - Live from Wacken Open Air 2010:

Charts

Personnel 
Credits for Poetry for the Poisoned adapted from liner notes.

Kamelot
 Roy Khan – vocals
 Thomas Youngblood – guitars
 Sean Tibbetts – bass
 Oliver Palotai – keyboards
 Casey Grillo – drums, percussion

Additional personnel
 Simone Simons – vocals on "House on a Hill" and "Poetry for the Poisoned, Pt. II–III"
 Björn "Speed" Strid – screams on "The Great Pandemonium"
 Jon Oliva – vocals on "The Zodiac"
 Gus G. – guitar solo on "Hunter's Season"
 Amanda Somerville – choir vocals on "Poetry for the Poisoned, Pt. I-IV" and vocals on "The Zodiac"
 Chanty Wunder – female vocals on "Where the Wild Roses Grow"
 Robert Hunecke-Rizzo – backing vocals
 Simon Oberender – backing vocals
 Thomas Rettke – backing vocals
 Cloudy Yang – backing vocals

Production
 Sascha Paeth – additional guitars, mixing, mastering, engineering
 Miro – additional keyboards, orchestrations, engineering
 Seth Siro Anton – cover art, artwork
 Michał Loranc – additional artwork, layout
 Natalie Shau – additional artwork
 Alexandra Dekimpe – additional artwork
 Rachel Youngblood – additional artwork

References

2010 albums
Kamelot albums
Edel Music albums